Miguel Angel Torres Quintana (born 17 January 1982) is a Peruvian former footballer who played, as a winger.

Career
Torres started out with Universitario and played for two years. He then went to Coronel Bolognesi for a year. He then played two years for Sport Boys and finally played for Cienciano before returning to Universitario in 2007. In 2007, he did not play regularly. However, in 2008 he became part of the starting line-up and played the right-wing midfield with a lot of success due to his speed and stamina.

Torres has made five appearances for the Peru national football team.

Honours

Club
Universitario de Deportes
 Apertura: 2008
 Torneo Descentralizado (2): 2009, 2013

References

External links

1982 births
Living people
Footballers from Lima
Peruvian footballers
Peru international footballers
Peruvian Primera División players
Club Universitario de Deportes footballers
Coronel Bolognesi footballers
Sport Boys footballers
Cienciano footballers
Association football wingers